Laval-Morency is a commune in the Ardennes department and Grand Est region of north-eastern France.

Geography
The Sormonne flows through the commune and village of Laval-Morency.

Population

See also
Communes of the Ardennes department

References

Communes of Ardennes (department)
Ardennes communes articles needing translation from French Wikipedia